The 1962 U.S. Open was the 62nd U.S. Open, held June 14–17 at Oakmont Country Club in Oakmont, Pennsylvania, a suburb northeast of Pittsburgh. Jack Nicklaus defeated 1960 champion Arnold Palmer in an 18-hole Sunday playoff that marked the beginning of their legendary rivalry. For Nicklaus, it was his first professional win, the first of four U.S. Open titles and a record 18 major championships. Though just 22, it was Nicklaus' sixth U.S. Open and tenth major, having played in four Masters. He had won the U.S. Amateur twice (1959, 1961) and was the top amateur at the previous two Opens, placing second to Palmer in 1960 and fourth in 1961.

Nicklaus earned $15,000 for his first professional win, and Palmer $8,000 as runner-up. Each received a playoff bonus of $2,500 from the Sunday gate receipts.

Only two of the six former champions in the field made the 36-hole cut, Palmer and defending champion Gene Littler.

Course layout

Source:

Lengths of the course for previous major championships:

Past champions in the field

Made the cut

Missed the cut

Round summaries

First round
Thursday, June 14, 1962

Defending champion Littler took the first round lead with a 69 (−2) before a record opening round gallery of 17,486, mostly following Palmer in the afternoon, paired with Nicklaus. The previous record was 13,916 in 1960 near Denver.

Second round
Friday, June 15, 1962

Palmer carded a 68 in the morning and Bob Rosburg a 69 to co-lead after 36 holes at 139 (−3), with Nicklaus three strokes back in a tie for fourth. Palmer and Nicklaus were paired together in the first two rounds. The second round attendance record was broken with 19,971 in the gallery, surpassing the previous mark of 15,225 set in 1961 near Detroit.

Source:

Third round
Saturday, June 16, 1962 - (morning)

Final round
Saturday, June 16, 1962 - (afternoon)

After 54 holes at Oakmont, Palmer held a share of the lead with Bobby Nichols, with Phil Rodgers and Bob Rosburg a stroke back, and Nicklaus and Gary Player two back. Rosburg shot a 79 (+8) in the final round and quickly fell out of contention, while Nichols and Rodgers carded scores of 73 and 72, respectively, to share 3rd place. But the story of this day was the duel between Palmer and Nicklaus. Although he bogeyed the 9th, Palmer still led Nicklaus as they made the turn. That would change quickly as Nicklaus birdied 11 and Palmer bogeyed 13, evening up the score. Nicklaus missed a birdie attempt at the last to finish with a 69, while Palmer missed a birdie at 18 from  that would have won the championship. This set up an 18-hole playoff between golf's most popular player and the game's rising star.

Source:

Scorecard
Final round

Cumulative tournament scores, relative to par
{|class="wikitable" span = 50 style="font-size:85%;
|-
|style="background: Pink;" width=10|
|Birdie
|style="background: PaleGreen;" width=10|
|Bogey
|}
Source:

Playoff 
Sunday, June 17, 1962

The 10,000 that showed up for the playoff on Sunday were decidedly pro-Palmer, constantly taunting the 22-year-old upstart from Ohio. (Palmer was from nearby Latrobe and had won two of the last three majors, with five overall.) Nicklaus, however, silenced the crowd by going up by four strokes after six holes. Palmer then launched one of his patented charges with birdies at 9, 11, and 12 to close within one, but a three-putt bogey at 13 proved to be costly for Palmer. Nicklaus held him off from there and prevailed by three strokes, carding a 71 to Palmer's 74. Nicklaus won the championship on the greens; he had just one three-putt the entire week, while Palmer had 10. Nicklaus became the youngest winner of the U.S. Open since Bobby Jones in 1923, and became the first since Jones to hold the Open and the U.S. Amateur championship at the same time; he had won the Amateur the previous year before turning pro in the winter. For Palmer, this began a frustrating stretch as a runner-up in four U.S. Opens in six years, with three in playoffs. His words after the tournament proved prophetic, saying of Nicklaus: "Now that the big guy is out of the cage, everybody better run for cover."

Included in earnings is a playoff bonus of $2,500 each, from the playoff gate receipts.

Scorecard
Playoff

{|class="wikitable" span = 50 style="font-size:85%;
|-
|style="background: Pink;" width=10|
|Birdie
|style="background: PaleGreen;" width=10|
|Bogey
|style="background: Green;" width=10|
|Double bogey
|}
Source:

References

External links
USGA Championship Database
USOpen.com - 1962

U.S. Open (golf)
Golf in Pennsylvania
U.S. Open
U.S. Open (golf)
U.S. Open
U.S. Open (golf)